Meeussen is a former Belgian car manufacturer. The brothers Meeussen were car manufacturers between 1955 and 1972. They built a van from a VW Beetle.

References

External links 
 Meeussen pictures

Defunct motor vehicle manufacturers of Belgium